Eupithecia albistillata is a moth in the  family Geometridae. It is found in Kenya.

References

Endemic moths of Kenya
Moths described in 1932
albistillata
Moths of Africa